Mecyclothorax rotundatus is a species of ground beetle in the subfamily Psydrinae. It was described by Lorenz in 1998.

References

rotundatus
Beetles described in 1998